The cricothyroid muscle is the only tensor muscle of the larynx aiding with phonation. It is innervated by the superior laryngeal nerve. Its action tilts the thyroid forward to help tense the vocal cords.

Structure 
The cricothyroid muscle originates from the anterolateral aspect of the cricoid cartilage, and inserts to the inferior cornu and lower lamina of the thyroid cartilage.

Innervation 
This muscle is the only laryngeal muscle innervated by the superior laryngeal branch of the vagus nerve known as the superior laryngeal nerve.

Function
The cricothyroid muscle produces tension and elongation of the vocal cords. They draw up the arch of the cricoid cartilage and tilt back the upper border of the cricoid cartilage lamina. The distance between the vocal processes and the angle of the thyroid is increased, and the folds are consequently elongated, resulting in higher pitch phonation. They work as antagonists to the posterior cricoarytenoid muscles.

Clinical significance 
The cricothyroid muscles may be injected with botulinum toxin whilst treating spasmodic dysphonia. This is usually performed under guidance from electromyography.

Additional images

See also
 Cricothyroid ligament
 Larynx
 vocal fold
 Thyroid cartilage
 Vocology - science and practice of voice habilitation
 Adam's apple
 Phonation
 National Center for Voice and Speech
 Cricothyroid approximation

References 

Muscles of the head and neck